The  New York Giants season was the franchise's 2nd season in the National Football League. They ended with an 8–4–1 regular season record and had one postseason appearance against the AFL Philadelphia Quakers, which the Giants won 31–0.

Schedule

Standings

See also
List of New York Giants seasons

External links
1926 New York Giants season at Pro Football Reference

New York Giants seasons
New York Giants
New York Giants
1920s in Manhattan
Washington Heights, Manhattan